Eugenius I (died 242) was Bishop of Byzantium from 237 to 242.

242 deaths
Bishops of Byzantium
3rd-century Romans
Year of birth unknown